The 2018–19 Russian Premier League was the 27th season of the premier football competition in Russia since the dissolution of the Soviet Union and the 16th under the current Russian Premier League name. Lokomotiv Moscow came into the season as the defending champions.

The new logo was presented on 24 July 2018, there was no title sponsor announced for the season.

Teams
As in the previous season, 16 teams will play in the 2018–19 season. After the 2017–18 season, Anzhi Makhachkala, Tosno and SKA-Khabarovsk were relegated to the 2018–19 Russian National Football League. They were replaced by three clubs from the 2017–18 Russian National Football League, Orenburg, Krylya Sovetov Samara, and Yenisey Krasnoyarsk. Orenburg and Krylya Sovetov returned after one season of absence while Yenisey make their debut in the Premier League.

On 13 June 2018, FC Amkar Perm announced that the Russian Football Union recalled their 2018–19 season license, making them ineligible for the Russian Premier League or Russian Football National League. FC Anzhi Makhachkala, which was already licensed for the 2018–19 Premier League before losing in the 2017–18 relegation play-offs, was eligible to stay in the league ahead of the other relegation play-off losing club, FC Tambov. Anzhi re-applied for the Premier League membership on 15 June and was officially re-admitted into the Premier League on 22 June.

Venues

Personnel and kits

Managerial changes

Tournament format and regulations

Basic
The 16 teams will play a round-robin tournament whereby each team plays each one of the other teams twice, once at home and once away. Thus, a total of 240 matches will be played, with 30 matches played by each team.

Promotion and relegation
The teams that finish 15th and 16th will be relegated to the FNL, while the top 2 in that league will be promoted to the Premier League for the 2019–20 season.

The 13th and 14th Premier League teams will play the 4th and 3rd FNL teams respectively in two playoff games with the winners securing Premier League spots for the 2019–20 season.

League table

Relegation play-offs
The draw for relegation play-offs scheduling took place on 16 May 2019. The referees (including VAR teams) were appointed on 27 May 2019.

First leg

Second leg

FC Ufa won 2–1 on aggregate and retained their spot in the 2019–20 Russian Premier League; Tom Tomsk remained in the 2019–20 Russian National Football League.

Krylia Sovetov won 3–2 on aggregate and retained their spot in the 2019–20 Russian Premier League; Nizhny Novgorod remained in the 2019–20 Russian National Football League.

Results

Positions by round
The table lists the positions of teams after each week of matches. In order to preserve chronological evolvements, any postponed matches are not included to the round at which they were originally scheduled, but added to the full round they were played immediately afterwards.

Season statistics

Top goalscorers

Top assists

Attendances

Awards

Top 33
On 26 June 2019, Russian Football Union named its list of 33 top players:

Other awards announced on the same day included:

Player of the year: Artem Dzyuba.

Hope prize (under-21 players): Matvei Safonov (Krasnodar).

Coach of the year: Sergei Semak (Zenit).

Team of the year: FC Zenit Saint Petersburg.

For contribution to football development: Stanislav Cherchesov.

See also
 Russian National Football League
 Russian Cup

References

Notes

External links

Russian Premier League seasons
1
Russian Premier League|Rus